The Château Haldimand was a castle that stood where the Château Frontenac now stands in Quebec City, Quebec, Canada. The building was constructed between 1784 and 1786.

History 

In 1784, Quebec Governor Frederick Haldimand ordered construction of the château. It became the seat of the colonial government of the province of Quebec from 1786 to 1791.

In 1860, the Canadian government established administrative offices and the headquarters of the Legislative Assembly of Canada in the castle until 1866.

The castle was later used as part of Laval University until 1892, when it was demolished to make way for the construction of the Château Frontenac.

References

External links

Castles in Canada
18th century in Quebec City
Buildings and structures in Quebec City
Government buildings completed in 1786
Buildings and structures demolished in 1892
1786 establishments in the Province of Quebec (1763–1791)